Yazidism, alternatively Sharfadin is a monotheistic ethnic religion that has roots in a western Iranic pre-Zoroastrian religion directly derived from the Indo-Iranian tradition. It is followed by the mainly Kurmanji-speaking Yazidis and is based on belief in one God who created the world and entrusted it into the care of seven Holy Beings, known as Angels. Preeminent among these Angels is Tawûsê Melek (also spelled as "Melek Taûs"), who is the leader of the Angels and who has authority over the world.

History

Principal beliefs

According to some Yazidi hymns (known as Qewls), God has 1,001 names, or 3,003 names according to other Qewls. In Yazidism, fire, water, air, and the earth are sacred elements that are not to be polluted. During prayer Yazidis face towards the sun, for which they were often called "sun worshippers". The Yazidi myth of creation begins with the description of the emptiness and the absence of order in the Universe. First there was an esoteric world, and after that an exoteric world was created. Before the creation of this world God created seven Divine Beings (often called "Angels" in Yazidi literature) to whom he assigned all the world's affairs; the leader of the Seven Angels was appointed Tawûsî Melek ("Peacock Angel"). The end of Creation is closely connected with the creation of mankind and the transition from mythological to historical time.

Tawûsê Melek

The Yazidis believe in a divine Triad. The original, hidden God of the Yazidis is considered to be remote and inactive in relation to his creation, except to contain and bind it together within his essence. His first emanation is Melek Taûs, who functions as the ruler of the world. The second hypostasis of the divine Triad is the Sheikh 'Adī ibn Musafir. The third is Sultan Ezid. These are the three hypostases of the one God. The identity of these three is sometimes blurred, with Sheikh 'Adī considered to be a manifestation of Tawûsê Melek and vice versa; the same also applies to Sultan Ezid. Yazidis are called  ("the nation of Tawûsê Melek").

In the Yazidi myth of creation, Tawûsê Melek refused to bow before Adam, the first human, when God ordered the Seven Angels to do so. The command was actually a test, meant to determine which of these angels was most loyal to God by not prostrating themselves to someone other than their creator. This belief has been linked by some people to the Islamic mythological narrative on Iblis, who also refused to prostrate to Adam, despite God's express command to do so. Because of this similarity to the Islamic tradition of Iblis, Muslims and followers of other Abrahamic religions have erroneously associated and identified the Peacock Angel with their own conception of the unredeemed evil spirit Satan, a misconception which has incited centuries of violent religious persecution of the Yazidis as "devil-worshippers". Persecution of Yazidis has continued in their home communities within the borders of modern Iraq.

Yazidis, however, believe Tawûsê Melek is not a source of evil or wickedness. They consider him to be the leader of the archangels, not a fallen angel. Yazidis argue that the order to bow to Adam was only a test for Tawûsê Melek, since if God commands anything then it must happen. In other words, God could have made him submit to Adam, but gave Tawûsê Melek the choice as a test: God had directed him not to bow to any other being, and his refusal of the later order to bow to Adam was thus obedience to God's original command.

Holy figures

Yezidis believe in Seven Angels, considered the emanations of God, who, In Yazidi creation stories, were created by God from his own light before the creation of this world. God assigned all of the world's affairs to these seven Angels and Tawûsê Melek was appointed as the leader. The angels are also referred to as Heft Sirr ("the Seven Mysteries"). In this context, they have, so to speak, a part of God in themselves. This pure divine essence called Sur or Sirr has its own personality and will and is also called  ('the Sur of God'). This term refers to the essence of the Divine itself, that is, God. The Angels share this essence from their creator who is God. In religious literature, these Angels are sometimes referred to as Cibrayîl, Ezrayîl, Mîkayîl, Şifqayîl, Derdayîl, Ezafîl, and Ezazîl. The leader of these Angels is known as Tawûsê Melek, and the others are better known by the names of their earthly incarnations/representations: Fexreddin, Sheikh Shems, Nasirdin, Sejadin, Sheikh Obekr, and Shex Hesen (Şêxsin).

The Yazidi pantheon contains a total of 365 holy figures venerated by Yazidis, designated by various special terms including Xudan, Xas, Mêr and Babçak. According to Yazidi beliefs, God is almighty and absolute, and the Xudans are a part of His power, moreover, in relation to nature, Yazidis believe in Xudans for most of natural elements and phenomena and they are regarded as divine powers that have control over these phenomena. In Yazidi mythology, the Xudans appeared after the creation of the world for the four elements of nature and their manifestations.

Sheikh 'Adī

One of the important figures of Yazidism is Sheikh 'Adī ibn Musafir. He died in 1162, and his tomb at Laliş is a focal point of Yazidi pilgrimage and the principal Yazidi holy site. Yazidism has many influences: Sufi influence and imagery (especially taken from Mansur al-Hallaj) can be seen in the religious vocabulary, especially in the terminology of the Yazidis' esoteric literature, but most of the theology, rituals, traditions, and festivals remains non-Islamic. Its cosmogony for instance has many points in common with those of ancient Iranian religions.

Rebirth and concept of time
Yazidis believe in the rebirth of the soul. Like the Ahl-e Haqq, the Yazidis use the metaphor of a change of garment to describe the process, which plays an exceptional role in Yazidi religiosity and is called the "change of [one's] shirt". There is also a belief that some of the events from the time of creation repeat themselves in cycles of history. In Yazidism, different concepts of time coexist:

 An esoteric time sphere, This term denotes a state of being before the creation of the world. According to Yazidi cosmogony, there is God and a pearl in this stage. 
Therefore, it may also mean 'renewing' or 'renewed' and designates the start of a renewed period of time.
 A linear course, which runs from the start of the creation by God to the collective eschatological end point.
 Three  ('storm, flood') i.e. catastrophes. It is believed that there are three big events during history named tofan that play a purificatory role, changing the quality of life in a positive manner. Each catastrophe, which ultimately brings renewal to the world, takes place through a basic element: the first through water, the second through fire and the last is connected with wind (air). It is believed that the first  has already occurred in the past and that the next tofan will occur through fire. According to this perception, the three sacred elements, namely water, fire and air, purify the fourth one, the earth. These events however are not be considered as eschatological events. They occur during the life of people. Although the purificatory events cause many deaths, ultimately life continues.
In Yazidism, the older original concept of metempsychosis and the cyclic perception of the course of time is harmonised and coexists with the younger idea of a collective eschatology.

Cosmogony and beginning of life
The Yazidi cosmogony is recorded in several sacred texts and traditions. It can therefore only be inferred and understood through an overall view of the sacred texts and traditions. The cosmogony can be divided into three stages:

 Enzel – the state before the pearl burst.
 Developments immediately after the burst – cosmogony II
 The creation of the earth and man – anthropogony

The term Enzel is one of the frequently mentioned terms in the religious vocabulary and it comes up numerous times in the religious hymns, known as Qewls. For instance, in Qewlê Tawisî Melek:"" (English: Oh, Creator of the Enzel, you are infinite)And Dûa Razanê:(English: I am a follower of God, I come from an "enzelî" pearl)Thus, the term Enzel can also be referred to as a "pure, spiritual, immaterial and infinite world", "the Beyond" or "the sphere beyond the profane world". The Enzel stage describes a spaceless and timeless state and therefore illustrates a supernatural state. In this stage, initially there is only a God, who creates a pearl out of his own light, in which his shining throne is located.Qewlê Bê Elif:

 – My King created the white pearl from himself

Textê nûrî sedef – The shining throne in the pearl

The Yazidi qewls mention the universe as having originated from a white pearl that existed in pre-eternity. At the beginning of the time prior to the creation, God emerged from the cosmic pearl, which rested on the horns of a bull that stood on the back of a fish. After God and the pearl separated, the universe burst out of the pearl and became visible as waves rippled across from pearl to form the primeval Cosmic Ocean. As the pearl burst open, the beginning of the material universe was set in motion.  (meaning 'love') came into being and was laid as the original foundation, colours began to form, and red, yellow and white began to shine from the burst pearl.

The Yazidi religion has its own perception of the colours, which is seen in the mythology and shown through clothing taboos, in religious ceremonies, customs and rituals. Colours are perceived as the symbolizations of nature and the beginning of life, thus the emphasis of colours can be found in the creation myth. The colors white, red, green and yellow in particular are frequently emphasized. White is considered the color of purity and peace and is the main colour of the religious clothing of the Yazidis.

Yazidi accounts of the creation differ significantly from those of the Abrahamic religions (Judaism, Christianity, and Islam), since they are derived from the Ancient Mesopotamian and Indo-Iranian traditions; therefore, Yazidi cosmogony is closer to those of Ancient Iranian religions, Yarsanism, and Zoroastrianism.

Yazidi sacred texts

The poetic literature is composed in an advanced and archaic language where more complex terms are used, which may be difficult to understand for those who are not trained in religious knowledge. Therefore, they are accompanied by some prosaic genres of the Yazidi literature that often interpret the contents of the poems and provide explanations of their contexts in the spoken language comprehensible among the common population. Yazidis are also said to have two holy books, Book of Revelation and Black Book whose authenticities are debated among scholars.

Holy books 
The Yazidi holy books are claimed to be the Book of Revelation and Black Book. Scholars generally agree that the manuscripts of both books published in 1911 and 1913 were forgeries written by non-Yazidis in response to Western travellers' and scholars' interest in the Yazidi religion; however, the material in them is consistent with authentic Yazidi traditions True texts of those names may have existed, but remain obscure. The real core texts of the religion that exist today are the hymns known as qawls; they have also been orally transmitted during most of their history, but are now being collected with the assent of the community, effectively transforming Yazidism into a scriptural religion. The sacred texts had already been translated into English by the early 20th century.

Qewl and Beyt 
A very important genre of oral literature of the Yazidi community consists of religious hymns, called s, which literally means 'word, speech' (from Arabic ). The performers of these hymns, called the Qewal, constitute a distinct class within the Yazidi society. They are a veritable source of ancient Yazidi lore and are traditionally recruited from the non-religious members of other Kurdish tribes, principally the Dumilî and Hekarî. The qewls are full of cryptic allusions and usually need to be accompanied by čirōks ('stories') that explain their context.

Mishur 
Mishurs are a type of sacred manuscripts that were written down in the 13th century and handed down to each lineage of the Pirs; each of the manuscripts contain descriptions of the founder of the Pir lineage that they were distributed to, along with a list of Kurdish tribes and other priestly lineages that were affiliated with the founder. According to the Yazidi tradition, there are a total of 40 mishurs which were distributed to the 40 lineages of Pirs.

Festivals

Yazidi New Year 

It falls in spring, on the first Wednesday of the April and Nîsan months in the Julian and Seleucid calendars, i.e. the first Wednesday on or after 14 April according to the Gregorian calendar.

Feast of Êzî 

Which every year takes place on the first Friday on or after the 14th of December. Before this festival, the Yazidis fast for three days, where nothing is eaten from sunrise to sunset. The  festival is celebrated in honor of God and the three days of fasting before are also associated with the ever shorter days before the winter solstice, when the sun is less and less visible. With the  festival, the fasting time is ended. The festival is often celebrated with music, food, drinks and dance.

Tawûsgeran 

These are venerated, fees are collected from the pious, sermons are preached and holy water and berat (small stones from Lalish) distributed.

Feast of the Assembly 

The festival is celebrated from 6 October to 13 October, in honor of the Sheikh Adi. It is an important time for cohesion.

If possible, Yazidis make at least one pilgrimage to Lalish during their lifetime, and those living in the region try to attend at least once a year for the Feast of the Assembly in autumn.

Tiwaf 

Tiwafs are yearly feasts of shrines and their holy beings which constitute an important part of Yazidi religious and communal life. Every village that contains a shrine holds annual tiwafs in the name of the holy being to which the shrine is dedicated.

Religious practices

Prayers
Prayers occupy a special status in Yazidi literature. They contain important symbols and religious knowledge connected with the Holy Men, God, and daily situations. The prayers are mostly private and as a rule they are not performed in public. Yazidis pray towards the sun, usually privately, or the prayers are recited by one person during a gathering. The prayers are classified according to their own content. There are:

 Prayers dedicated to God and holy beings
 Prayers of Yazidi castes
 Prayers for specific occasions
 Rite of passage prayers
 Prayers against health problems and illnesses
 Daily prayers
 Prayers connected with the nature, i.e. the moon, stars, sun, etc.

Purity and taboos

Many Yazidis consider pork to be prohibited. However, many Yazidis living in Germany began to view this taboo as a foreign belief from Judaism or Islam and not part of Yazidism, and therefore abandoned this rule. Furthermore, in a BBC interview in April 2010, Baba Sheikh, the spiritual leader of all Yazidis, stated that ordinary Yazidis may eat what they want, but the religious clergy refrain from certain vegetables (including cabbage) because "they cause gases".

Some Yazidis in Armenia and Georgia who converted to Christianity, still identify as Yazidis even after converting, but are not accepted by the other Yazidis as Yazidis.

Customs

Children are baptised at birth and circumcision is not required, but is practised by some due to regional customs. The Yazidi baptism is called  (literally: 'to seal'). It involves pouring holy water from the spring on the child's head three times.

Religious organisation

The Yazidis are strictly endogamous; members of the three Yazidi castes, the murids, sheikhs, and pirs, marry only within their group.

There are several religious duties that are performed by several dignitaries, such as the Mir Hejj (Prince of the Pilgrimage), Sheikh el-Wazir (who oversees the sanctuary of Sheikh Shems at Lalish), Pire Esbiya (treasurer of the sanctuary of Sheikh Shems at Lalish), Mijewir (local shrine custodian), Baba Chawush (guardian of the sanctuary of Sheikh Adi), and others.

See also

List of Yazidi holy places
List of Yazidi saints
List of Yazidi settlements
Mandaeism
Persecution of Yazidis by Muslims
Yazdânism

References

Bibliography

Rodziewicz Artur (2022). Hosseini S. Behnaz (ed.) "The Mystery of Essence and the Essence of Mystery: Yezidi and Yaresan Cosmogonies in the Light of the Kitab al-Tawasin", Yari Religion in Iran: Palgrave Macmillan, Singapore. https://doi.org/10.1007/978-981-16-6444-1_6

 
Asian ethnic religion
Iranian religions
Mesopotamian religion
Monotheistic religions
Religion in Armenia
Religion in Georgia (country)
Religion in Iraq
Religion in Kurdistan
Religion in Syria
Religion in Turkey
Yazidi culture
Yazidi mythology
Ethnic religion
Kurdish words and phrases